Aleksandr Aleksandrovich Tenyagin (16 August 192726 March 2008) was a Soviet football player and manager.

Honours
 Soviet Top League bronze: 1952.

International career
Tenyagin played his only game for USSR on 15 July 1952, in a 1952 Olympics game against Bulgaria.

References

External links
Profile 
Biography of Aleksandr Tenyagin 

1927 births
2008 deaths
People from Gatchina
Russian footballers
Soviet footballers
Association football forwards
Soviet Union international footballers
Olympic footballers of the Soviet Union
Footballers at the 1952 Summer Olympics
Soviet football managers
FC Dynamo Moscow players
FC Dynamo Saint Petersburg players
Soviet Top League players
Sportspeople from Leningrad Oblast